Waldo Porter Johnson (born September 16, 1817August 14, 1885) was an American politician who served as a Confederate States Senator from Missouri from 1863 to 1865.

Biography
Born in Bridgeport, Virginia (present-day West Virginia), Waldo Porter Johnson attended public and private schools, graduated from Rector College (Pruntytown, Virginia) in 1839. He studied law and was admitted to the bar, commencing practice in Harrison County, Virginia in 1841. He moved to Osceola, Missouri in 1842 and continued the practice of law, and served in the Mexican–American War as a member of the First Missouri Regiment of Mounted Volunteers. In 1847 he was a member of the Missouri House of Representatives and was elected circuit attorney in 1848 and judge of the seventh judicial circuit in 1851. He resigned in 1852 and resumed the practice of law.

Johnson was a member of the peace convention of 1861 held in Washington, D.C., in an effort to devise means to prevent the impending American Civil War; he was elected as a Democrat to the United States Senate and served from March 17, 1861, to January 10, 1862, when he was expelled from the Senate for disloyalty to the government. He served in the Confederate Army during the Civil War and attained the rank of lieutenant colonel of the 4th Missouri Infantry Regiment, and was appointed a member of the Confederate States Senate to fill a vacancy.

From August 1865 to April 1866, Johnson resided in Hamilton, Ontario. He returned to Osceola and resumed the practice of his profession. Johnson was president of the State constitutional convention in 1875 and in 1885 died in Osceola. Interment was in Forest Hill Calvary Cemetery in Kansas City, Missouri.

Waldo Johnson was a nephew of Joseph Johnson, a U.S. Representative and Governor of Virginia.

See also
 List of United States senators expelled or censured

References

 Retrieved on 2008-02-13

External links
 

|-

1817 births
1885 deaths
19th-century American judges
19th-century American politicians
Burials in Missouri
Confederate States Army officers
Confederate States of America senators
Democratic Party United States senators from Missouri
Expelled United States senators
Democratic Party members of the Missouri House of Representatives
Military personnel from West Virginia
Missouri state court judges
People from Bridgeport, West Virginia
People from Osceola, Missouri
People of Missouri in the American Civil War